Yolanda of Aragon (1273 – August 1302) was the daughter of Peter III of Aragon and Constance of Sicily. She married Robert of Naples, but was never Queen of Naples since she died before her husband inherited the throne.

On 23 March 1297, in Rome, Yolanda married Robert. He was the third born son of Charles II of Naples and Maria Arpad of Hungary. Robert married Yolanda in exchange for James II of Aragon's renouncing of Sicily (James was Yolanda's brother).

Yolanda was then escorted to Naples by her new brother-in-law, Raymond Berengar of Andria.

Yolanda and Robert had two sons:
 Charles (1298–1328), Duke of Calabria (1309), Viceroy of Naples (1318), who was the father of Queen Joan I of Naples
 Louis (1301–10)

The same month as Yolanda's death was the peace of Caltabellotta, which ended the war of the Vespers. Her husband inherited the throne seven years later.

On Yolanda's death, Robert married Sancha of Majorca. This marriage was childless.

References 

1273 births
1302 deaths
Aragonese infantas
Duchesses of Calabria
House of Aragon
13th-century people from the Kingdom of Aragon
13th-century Spanish women
14th-century people from the Kingdom of Aragon
14th-century Spanish women
Daughters of kings